Riggenbach is a Germanic surname of Swiss origin. 

Albert Riggenbach (19th century), meteorologist
Niklaus Riggenbach (1817-1899), Swiss inventor
Riggenbach counter-pressure brake
Riggenbach rack system
Holly Black née Riggenbach (born 1971), American writer and editor

See also
Riggenbach's gerbil, an African gerbil species